Hasseris is a district of the city of Aalborg and a former municipality in the northeast of Denmark. As of 2016, Hasseris had 11,685 inhabitants.

References

Neighbourhoods in Aalborg
Aalborg